Mabry may refer to:

Surname
 Dale Mabry (1891–1922), American World War I aviator
 Dale Mabry Highway, Florida
 Dale Mabry Field, Florida
 Edward Mabry (1897–1989), American author, poet, and chemical tycoon
 George L. Mabry, Jr. (1917–1990), general in U.S. Army
 Harry Mabry, television news director and anchor in Alabama
 John Mabry (born 1970), Major League Baseball player
 John P. Mabry (born 1969), Texas politician
 Joseph Alexander Mabry, Jr. (1826–1882), American Civil War General and businessman in Knoxville, Tennessee
 Lynn Mabry, American singer
 Mark Mabry, American photographer and journalist
 Mike Mabry (born 1980), American football player
 Milton H. Mabry, Lieutenant Governor of Florida 1885-1889
 Moss Mabry (1918–2006), costume designer
 Nathan Mabry (born 1978), American artist
 Thomas J. Mabry (1884–1962), New Mexico politician and judge
 Tyler Mabry (born 1996), American football player

Other
 Camp Mabry, a military installation in Austin, Texas
 Mabry-Hazen House, an historic house and museum in Knoxville, Tennessee
 Mabry Mill, a grist mill on the Blue Ridge Parkway in  Virginia
 Justice Mabry (disambiguation)